3Roam  provides high-capacity microwave transmission equipments for wireless and packet networks convergence.  3Roam solutions aim at bridging the gap between traditional microwave transmission technologies and advanced networking techniques.

By nature, microwave links characteristics are variable. Weather conditions can reduce the performances of a link, decreasing significantly its capacity. 3Roam equipments overcome these limitations by incorporating a packet router, that re-routes packets intelligently in the network, in case such perturbation occurs.

3Roam solutions integrate seamlessly in corporate networks or network operators backhaul systems through their native packet architectures and allow for the smart inclusion of microwave links into an overall packet transport system.

Corporate history
3Roam was founded in 2005. The founding team identified very early that microwave transmission equipments were still using outdated transport protocols inherited from the early telecom days, while the introduction of label switching and MPLS protocols were revolutionizing IP transport networks.

To get microwave technologies ready to take up the challenge of being an active part in complex IP transport networks, the company developed its MicrowaveRouter  product.
3Roam's MicrowaveRouter is the first microwave equipment to incorporate a complete native IP layer 3 processing core, while competing products only support on plain Ethernet switching.

Notes

External links
 3Roam Home Page
 Article about 3ROAM financing round 

Telecommunications companies of France